WHYL (960 kHz) is a commercial AM radio station licensed to Carlisle, Pennsylvania and serving the Harrisburg metropolitan area. The station is owned by Harold Z. Swidler, with the license held by WHYL, Inc.  It broadcasts an oldies radio format.  It also carries Baltimore Orioles baseball games.  The radio studios and offices are on North Hanover Street in Carlisle.

By day, WHYL is powered at 5,000 watts non-directional.  But to protect other stations on 960 AM from interference at night, it drops its power to only 22 watts.  The transmitter is on East Baltimore Street in Carlisle, near Interstate 81.   WHYL programming is simulcast around the clock on 160 watt FM translator W275CJ at 102.9 MHz. The translator tower is on Blue Mountain northeast of Carlisle.  It uses the FM translator's dial position in its slogan "Good Time Oldies 102.9 WHYL."

History

Its original call sign was WLXW. By the 1950s, Richard Field Lewis Jr. (1907–1957) had added WLXW (AM) to the Richard Field Lewis Jr. Stations (later Mid Atlantic Network Inc.).

Note that the newspaper article Dated December 6, 1948 refutes the information from Fabulous Fifty web site dated 1967 which is the basis for most of the other information here. See the clips attached. According to them the station went on the air as WLXW on December 4, 1948 and one of its first broadcasts was Santa coming to Carlisle. The station operated out of the building just south of town along Rt 34. The directional array tower system that was used formed a dual lobe pattern extending East-West from around Morgantown to around Everett. The owner was Col. Phillip Matthews, State Democratic (sic) chairman, and was placed in operation Saturday Morning. The 1000-watt station is operating daily from sunrise to sunset on a frequency of 1380 kHz. Jerry McDevitt, formerly of Altoona, was the manager of the station. The Rev. Harry Lee, Carlisle and Vincent Shafmeister, Camp Hill, a student at Dickinson College, were full-time announcers. Dave Taylor, also a Dickinson student was a part-time announcer. The station was located on the Mt. Holly Pike, one-fourth mile south of town. It was contained in a one-story structure, which has two studios, control room, newsroom with teletype, a record library and five offices. The 187-foot tower is at the same location.

The station's original frequency and call sign was WLXW/1380 which was moved to WHYL/960 in the early fifties, approximately 1952 or 53.

1965 The Lewis family hired Jim Frank from Iowa, a.k.a. Jack O. Lantern, to "modernize" the station.  WIOO was set to start broadcasting and it was obvious they planned on being a "rocker".  WHYL was changed from to a "hot" Top 40 station and some of the personnel was changed.  Jack O. Lantern became the morning man and the station became a hit maker in the area.  Lantern was awarded a "gold" record by Matty "Humdinger" Singer from Universal records in Philadelphia for breaking and promoting a new record called "Oh Sweet Pea" to number one in the country.  Lantern remained with the station until he formed a partnership with George Gardiner, the owner of Carlisle Cable Co. and together they built a brand new radio station called WEEO in Waynesboro, Pennsylvania.  New logos like "The Smile Guys" were created by Lantern to bolster its new popularity.
1966: The current morning show host, Ben Barber, joined the station (pictured in The Channel 96 WHYL Smile Guys, last head shot at the bottom) as the afternoon drive personality.  
1980: Format flip to country.
December 10, 1984: Post-sunset authorization was granted and began.
1989: Station is sold to Lincoln Zeve under Zeve Broadcasting, who flips format to adult standards.
2002: Citadel Broadcasting purchases the station and flips format to satellite based "Music of Your Life" oldies.
2004: Citadel sells the station to start-up company Route 81 Radio.
March 6, 2004: Route 81 drops oldies format for locally-originated adult standards.
February 14, 2005: Flipped format to talk format in an effort to compete with long-time talker WHP 580.
November 24, 2005: Began another format flip, stunting with an all-Christmas music format.
January 2, 2006: The station assumed the Adult standards format, still on the air today.
January 15, 2007: Royal Broadcasting, Inc. signs an asset purchase agreement  to buy the station and begins to operate it under an LMA.
January 14, 2008: Royal Broadcasting, Inc. does not renew its LMA because of the untimely processing of the request by the Federal Communications Commission partly due to a petition to deny filed on the license renewal.  Ownership defaults back to Route 81 Radio.  Petition to deny rejected by FCC and station is LMA'd to Trustworthy Radio LLC on July 15, 2008, with original Route 81 GM Bruce Collier returning as half-owner.  Adult Standards format remains along with Ben in the morning.

As of January 1, 2014 the station was off the air and no carrier signal was being broadcast. The station had filed for bankruptcy in 2012. Longtime morning host Ben Barber left the station in late 2013, at which time other programs, including the John Tesh syndicated midday show, were also discontinued. The station broadcasts were fully automated after this, and there were some periods during which a carrier signal was broadcast without any programming.  In June 2014, Harold Z. Swidler purchased the station, planning to return it to the air at partial power and eventually at full power.

On March 7, 2015, WHYL returned to the air with an oldies format, branded as "Good Time Oldies 960."

In 2015 and 2016, WHYL used a single element temporary antenna located on the tower with WCAT-FM "Red 102.3".  The station was operating on an FCC Special Temporary Authorization (STA) requested on December 19, 2014, and granted on March 10, 2015. The STA was extended on April 13, 2016, and expired on October 13, 2016. This allowed operation at the station's daytime nondirectional (omnidirectional antenna) power of 1.3 kilowatts and a nighttime power of 22 watts. The request was for 27 watts and reduced by the FCC to 22.

In mid-2016, WHYL began simulcasting on translator W275CJ and was rebranded as "Good Time Oldies 102.9 WHYL".

Translator
WHYL programming is broadcast on the following translator:

References

External links

HYL
Radio stations established in 1949
Oldies radio stations in the United States